Deadbolt is a 1992 made-for-television thriller film, by Douglas Jackson, and starring Justine Bateman, Adam Baldwin, and Michele Scarabelli.

Plot
When medical student Marty Hiller (Justine Bateman) places an ad for a roommate, her ad is answered by handsome, clean-cut Alec Danz (Adam Baldwin). At first Alec seems to be a wonderful roommate; supportive, considerate and a real friend. However, Alec's affection turns to obsession as he plots to manipulate and control all aspects of Marty's life, imprison her in her own apartment and make her his.

Cast 
Justine Bateman as Marty Hiller
Adam Baldwin  as Alec Danz
Michele Scarabelli as Theresa Velez
Cindy Pass as Diana
Chris Mulkey as Jordan
Colin Fox as Professor Rhodes
Amy Fulco as Michelle
Ellen David as Lani
Griffith Brewer as Beason
Mark Camacho as Phil
Isabelle Truchon as Linda
Anthony Sherwood as Detective Toren

External links

1992 films
American thriller television films
English-language Canadian films
Canadian thriller television films
Films directed by Douglas Jackson
1990s Canadian films
1990s English-language films